Datone Wayne Jones (born July 24, 1990) is an American football defensive tackle who is currently a free agent. He played college football at UCLA from 2008 to 2012 as a defensive end and defensive tackle. In 2008, he was named to the Rivals.com All-Pac-10 freshman team. In 2009, he earned sophomore All-America honorable mention honors from College Football News after finishing the season with 4 sacks and 11 tackles. He missed the entire 2010 season after suffering an injury to his right foot during fall camp. In 2012, he was named second-team All-Pac-12.

Jones was selected by the Green Bay Packers in the first round of the 2013 NFL Draft. In his first season, he was one of four rookies to appear in all 16 games. At the end of the 2014 season, he became the first defensive player in Packers history to register a blocked field goal and a fumble recovery in a playoff game. He was converted to outside linebacker during the 2015 season, and continued to play the position in the 2016 season. In 2017, Jones left the Packers to play with the Vikings, but was released on September 8, 2017, after being on injured reserve with a shoulder injury. He went on to play with the Detroit Lions, San Francisco 49ers, Dallas Cowboys, and Jacksonville Jaguars.

Early years
Jones was born in Los Angeles, California. He attended Compton High School in Compton, California, where he played as a defensive end for the Compton Tarbabes football team. During his junior year in 2006, he had 60 tackles and 4 sacks. As a senior, he had 91 tackles, 7 sacks, 2 fumble recoveries, 9 hurries, and 3 pass deflections. He was named second-team all-state by Cal-Hi sports. Furthermore, he was named Moore League co-defensive player of the year.

Jones played basketball in middle school and high school as a point guard. During his freshman year in 2004, he dreamed of being a basketball standout. On the weekends, he played with the likes of James Harden and DeMar DeRozan. He quit basketball his junior year to focus on football, but he lettered all four years in track and field.

During the spring, Jones ran the 100-, 200-, and 400-meter sprints at Compton. His best time in the 200 meters was 22.47 seconds as a sophomore. As a junior, at 240 pounds, he ran a personal-best time of 56.69 seconds in the 400 metres at a track meet in Long Beach. During his senior year, he participated in the men's shot put, the 100-meter, and the 200-meter.

College recruiting
Jones was highly recruited coming out of high school and was given a four-star prospect ranking by both Rivals.com and Scout.com. He ran the 40-yard dash in 4.8 seconds.  Scouts said that he had good explosion, pass rushing skills, and quickness off the ball, but also expressed concern about his techniques and moves. "I go low, fast and hard. That's my strength," Jones said. "Every coach I talk with says how much they love how I fly around sideline-to-sideline and hit. I think quarterbacks are afraid of me and I'm really hard to block because I have such a fast get off". He had an overall GPA of 3.0 and an 810 on the SAT. He received scholarship offers from UCLA, Arizona State, Colorado, Notre Dame, Oregon, Arizona, Nebraska, and USC. Jones ultimately decided to attend UCLA.

College career

In UCLA, Jones played defensive end and defensive tackle for the UCLA Bruins football team from 2008 to 2012. He finished his tenure with 43 starts (including his final 28 straight games), 148 tackles (90 solo), 36.5 tackles for loss, 12.5 sacks, 5 passes defensed, 4 forced fumbles, and 1 fumble recovery.

Jones participated in 10 games with 2 starts in his freshman season with the team. He started his first game against California, where he had a season-high 6 tackles (4 solo). He finished the year with 15 tackles and was named to the Rivals.com All-Pac-10 Freshman team. In his sophomore season, he started in all 13 games. During the season opener against San Diego State, he defensed 2 passes, a career high. On October 3, against Stanford, he had 3 tackles and sacked future NFL quarterback Andrew Luck, forcing a fumble, which he also recovered. He finished the season with 4 sacks and 11 tackles for a loss, which earned him Sophomore All-America honorable mention honors from College Football News.

In 2010, Jones missed the entire season due to a fractured right foot he suffered in fall camp. Returning from the injury the next season, he again started every game for the team and was named to the watch list for the Ted Hendricks Award, given annually to the best defensive linemen in college football. During a game against California, he had a career-best 2 sacks. He led the Bruins with 41 tackles, while also topping the team with 6.5 tackles for loss and 3.0 sacks.

Jones continued to be the starter during his final year with the team and was named to the Chuck Bednarik Award watch list; the award is given annually to the best defensive player in college football. In the first game against Rice, he had 6 tackles and 2 sacks, matching his career-high. During a game against the Nebraska Cornhuskers, he had a career-best 3 tackles for loss and was given credit for forcing a safety. He matched his career-high with 3 tackles for a loss and caught a 7-yard touchdown pass in the third game against Houston. When the Bruins faced California, he had 5 tackles (4 solo), 1 sack, and blocked an extra point. At the end of the year, he was selected to be second-team All-Conference by the Pac-12 coaches. He was also selected to play in the 2013 All-Star Senior Bowl.

College career statistics

Professional career
Jones was projected to be a late first-round or early second-round pick in the NFL Draft. Scouts observed that he was a sturdy athlete with a good initial explosion off the ball and good use of his hands. However, he was also said to lack the constant speed or flexibility to be a 4-3 defensive end.

Green Bay Packers
Jones was selected in the first round (26th overall) by the Green Bay Packers in the 2013 NFL Draft. He became the first UCLA defensive lineman taken in the first round since 1979 when Manu Tuiasosopo was drafted 18th overall by the Seattle Seahawks. Additionally, he was the first UCLA player selected in the first round since Jacksonville Jaguars tight end Marcedes Lewis in 2006. After being drafted, Jones stated that he was motivated by Reggie White. He said that he watched numerous films about White.

2013 season

Jones overcame an ankle injury suffered during the preseason and was healthy in time for the regular-season opening game; he did not miss any action during the year. He was one of four rookies to appear in all 16 games, rotated at defensive end, and was one of the interior rushers in the team's defensive formations. He finished the season with 10 tackles (7 solo), 3.5 sacks, and a fumble recovery, while also blocking an extra-point attempt.

2014 season
In 2014, Jones played in 13 games, starting 3 of those games. He finished the regular season with 21 tackles, 1.5 sacks, an interception returned for 18 yards, 2 passes defensed, and a fumble recovery. In week 16 against the Tampa Bay Buccaneers, he had his first interception. During a postseason divisional round contest against the Dallas Cowboys, he became the first Packer to register a blocked field goal and a fumble recovery in a playoff game, helping the Packers advance to the conference championship game.

2015 season
On July 2, 2015, the NFL announced that they would suspend Jones for one game for violating the league's substance abuse policy. According to a police report acquired by the Green Bay Press-Gazette, he was cited for marijuana a day after the Packers 28–22 overtime playoff loss against the Seahawks. He apologized for the suspension but did not appeal it, stating that there was "no reason to".

Jones played in 15 games during the regular season and appeared in both postseason contests. He posted 20 tackles (14 solo), 3 sacks, 3 passes defensed, and one kickoff return for 9 yards. He had 13 quarterback hits (good for second on the team), 12 quarterback pressures, and 3 passes defensed, which was the most among Packers defensive linemen. On October 11, 2015, he had three quarterback hits and a blocked field goal during the team's 24–10 victory against the St. Louis Rams, earning him the Milwaukee Journal Sentinel player of the week honor. On November 19, 2015, defensive coordinator Dom Capers announced that Jones would be converted to the outside linebacker position.

2016 season
On March 22, 2016, head coach Mike McCarthy announced that Jones would continue playing outside linebacker and would line up as an edge rusher. On May 3, 2016, the Packers declined the fifth-year option, making him a free agent after the season unless he signed a new contract with the Packers. On November 4, 2016, he was fined $36,434 for roughing the passer in Week 8 against the Atlanta Falcons. On December 23, 2016, he was fined $9,115, this time for a facemask penalty. He played in 15 games in the regular season and appeared in all 3 postseason contests. He posted 31.5 pressures, 22 tackles (17 solo), 1 sack, and 2 passes defensed.

Jones recorded nine sacks in 59 games throughout his Packers career. Although he was functional as a rotational player, he was unable to develop into an effective pass rusher and live up to the expectations of a first-round draft pick. His performance in 2016— only one sack in 548 snaps—led to the Packers letting him become a free agent.

Minnesota Vikings
Jones was signed by the Minnesota Vikings to a one-year contract on March 14, 2017. He stated that the Packers were not interested in re-signing him, and that the Vikings suit him better. 
 He was placed on injured reserve with a shoulder injury on September 2, 2017, but was released with an injury settlement six days later.

Detroit Lions
Jones signed with the Detroit Lions on October 11, 2017, after the Lions' defensive lineman Haloti Ngata suffered an elbow injury during a 24–27 loss against the Carolina Panthers. However, he was released a week later on October 18, 2017.

San Francisco 49ers
Jones signed a one-year deal with the San Francisco 49ers on October 24, 2017, to bolster the team's defensive line, which was plagued by injuries. He appeared in three games and made six tackles as a defensive end. However, he was waived on November 21 to make room for Tank Carradine.

Dallas Cowboys
Jones was signed by the Dallas Cowboys to a two-year contract on November 26, 2017. He appeared in four games as a backup defensive tackle, registering six tackles and one sack. In 2018, he missed the first two games of the regular season with a knee injury he suffered in the second preseason game against the Cincinnati Bengals. He only played in the third game against the Seattle Seahawks, where he took part in five special teams' snaps before suffering a hamstring injury. On September 25, 2018, he was placed on injured reserve for the rest of the season.

Jacksonville Jaguars
On June 4, 2019, Jones signed with the Jacksonville Jaguars. In the third preseason game, he registered six tackles during the team's 22–7 loss against the Miami Dolphins. He appeared in all four preseason games and registered 10 tackles, but was released on August 30, 2019 as part of the final roster cuts.

Las Vegas Raiders
Jones signed with the Las Vegas Raiders on August 14, 2020. He was released on September 5, 2020, and signed to the practice squad the next day. He was elevated to the active roster on October 10 for the team's week 5 game against the Kansas City Chiefs, and reverted to the practice squad after the game. He was released on November 23.

Montreal Alouettes
Jones signed with the Montreal Alouettes of the Canadian Football League (CFL) on January 21, 2021 and spent over two weeks in training camp. However, he was released by the team on July 27, 2021.

NFL career statistics

Personal life
Jones was raised by his single mother in Compton, California, alongside his brother and four sisters. In 2015, Jones's wife gave birth to their first child. On May 14, 2017, Jones tweeted that he bought his mother a new house on Mother's Day. On February 26, 2019, Jones was baptized in a crowd that includes his wife and fellow NFL players.

References

External links

 
 Datone Jones at UCLABruins.com

1990 births
Living people
Players of American football from Compton, California
Compton High School alumni
American football defensive ends
American football linebackers
UCLA Bruins football players
Green Bay Packers players
Minnesota Vikings players
Detroit Lions players
San Francisco 49ers players
Dallas Cowboys players
Jacksonville Jaguars players
Las Vegas Raiders players
Montreal Alouettes players